Marvin Hayes may refer to:

Marvin Hayes (basketball) (born 1986), Filipino basketball player
Marvin Hayes (painter) (born 1939), American painter and illustrator